#1 is the first full-length album by electroclash duo Fischerspooner released in 2001. It originally received a limited run on International DeeJay Gigolo Records, and contained "The 15th", a cover of a Wire song from their album 154. #1 has been re-pressed several times with a different track listing. The title "Fucker" was also censored on subsequent releases, either as "!@*$%#", "*#!@¥¿", or "*#!@Y?".

"Sweetness", "L.A. Song" and "Megacolon", all from the re-issue were originally released together on an EP titled #1 Supplement that was discontinued in time for the first re-issue. A limited edition pressing from 2003 also included a DVD with several remixes, a documentary, as well as four videos—"Sweetness", "The 15th" and two versions of "Emerge".

"Emerge" was listed at #243 on Pitchfork Media's Best songs of the 2000s.

Test Marketed DualDisc version of the album 
#1 was included among a group of 15 DualDisc releases that were test marketed in just two cities: Boston and Seattle. The DualDisc version of the album is rare. It has the standard album on one side, and bonus material on the second side. The DualDisc release was never reissued after the very limited test market run.

Reception
#1 received mostly favorable reviews from critics. The album holds a score of 70 out of 100 on the review aggregator website Metacritic.

The record was placed at number 34 in Q magazine's 2006 list, "The 50 Worst Albums Ever!"

Track listing
All tracks by Fischerspooner except where noted.

Personnel 

Bruce – Wardrobe
Jeffrey Deitch – Design
Angela DiCarlo – Make-Up
Brett Douglas – Photography
Adam Dugas – Vocals, Photography, Dramaturgist
Roe Ethridge – Photography
Warren Fischer – Composer
Fischerspooner – Producer
Jeff Francis – Hair Stylist
Agnieszka Gasparska – Photography, Web Design
Chris Gehringer – Mastering
Suzanne Geiss – Project Manager
Gary Graham – Wardrobe
Cindy Greene – Vocals, Singer
Lady Y Von La Force – Vocals
Mike Schmelling – Photography
Jeremy Scott – Wardrobe
Casey Spooner – Vocals, Lyricist
Nicolas Vernhes – Producer
Lizzy Yoder – Vocals, Singer
Zaldy – Wardrobe

References 

2001 debut albums
Fischerspooner albums
Capitol Records albums
Ministry of Sound albums